Francisco Otayza (1916 – 13 May 1980) was a Peruvian sports shooter. He competed in the 50 metre pistol event at the 1956 Summer Olympics.

References

External links
  

1916 births
1980 deaths
Peruvian male sport shooters
Olympic shooters of Peru
Shooters at the 1956 Summer Olympics